John Burneby was Archdeacon of Totnes from 1443 until 1453; and Vice-Chancellor of the University of Oxford from 1447 to 1449.

References

Archdeacons of Totnes
15th-century English people
Vice-Chancellors of the University of Oxford